Planet Pimp Records was a San Francisco based record label that featured bands from the local garage band scene. It was owned and represented by Sven-Erik Geddes. The label was dissolved later. Some of the bands on the roster were, The Mummies, The Dukes of Hamburg, The Trashwomen, The Phantom Surfers, The Go-Nuts, Thee Shatners and comedian Neil Hamburger. The label also released the soundtrack to the Meredith Lucas film, Blood Orgy of the Leather Girls.

References

Geddes interview at Entertainment Weekly, 1998

Defunct record labels of the United States
Garage rock record labels